The 2019–20 Premier League match between Southampton and Leicester City at St Mary's Stadium, Southampton, took place on Friday 25 October 2019. Leicester won the match 9–0, equalling Manchester United's 9–0 win against Ipswich Town in 1995 for the largest win in the history of the competition. The result also set the new record for the biggest away win in the history of English top-flight football.

Fifteen months later, on 2 February 2021, Southampton were beaten 9–0 again, this time to Manchester United. The 2021 loss to United made Southampton the first team to lose as such twice, let alone in consecutive seasons.

Background
Leicester started the match in third, level with Chelsea on 17 points but ahead on goal difference. Southampton were in 17th place, tied on 8 points with Newcastle United but also ahead on goal difference.

Match

Summary
Ben Chilwell opened the scoring in the 10th minute. Ryan Bertrand of Southampton was dismissed for a studs-up challenge in the build-up to the goal, confirmed by VAR, two minutes later. Leicester were 3–0 up by the 19th minute, thanks to Youri Tielemans and Ayoze Pérez. Pérez added the fourth on the 39th minute, with Jamie Vardy scoring on the stroke of half-time to send Leicester into the break ahead 5–0. Pérez completed his hat-trick on the 57th minute, with Vardy adding his second and Leicester's seventh a minute later. James Maddison scored a 85th minute free-kick before Jamie Vardy completed his own hat-trick with a penalty four minutes into stoppage time. The final whistle blasted after the penalty was made. It was only the second time in Premier League history that two players scored a hat-trick for one team in the same game, last coming in an Arsenal 6–1 win over Southampton on 7 May 2003 with Jermaine Pennant and Robert Pires scoring three goals apiece.

Match details

Statistics

Post-match

Leicester moved up to second in the table, while Southampton dropped to 18th. As the match took place two days before the first anniversary of the 2018 Leicester helicopter crash, several players dedicated the win to their late owner, Vichai Srivaddhanaprabha, who died in that incident. Southampton players and coaching staff later donated their wages from the day of the game to a charity run by the club, Saints Foundation.

Later that season, the two sides would play each other again in the return fixture at the King Power Stadium, in January 2020. Southampton went on to win the match 2–1.

References

2019–20 Premier League
Premier League matches
October 2019 sports events in the United Kingdom
2010s in Southampton
Leicester 2019
Southampton 2019
Record association football wins